The Yendegaia River originates from the terminus of Stoppani Glacier in Cordillera Darwin located at  southwestern Isla Grande de Tierra del Fuego. It is part of Yendegaia National Park.

See also
List of rivers of Chile

Rivers of Chile
Rivers of Magallanes Region
Isla Grande de Tierra del Fuego